The Mbaéré-Bodingué National Park is a National Park located in the south west of the Central African Republic. It covers 866 km². The Park is located between the Mbaéré and Bodingué rivers.

History  
The Park was established in 2007 by the Ministry of Water, Forests, Hunting and Fishing and the discontinued Forest Ecosystems in Central Africa (ECOFAC).

Flora and fauna  
The Park includes savannah, lowland floodplain forest and rainforest. 
The area is a biotope for elephants, gorillas, buffalos, chimpanzees, hippos and more than 400 different species of birds.

Population  
Beside the animals there are also different ethnic groups of humans that are located in the area and are losing their livelihood as they do hunting and fishing.

References

External links 
 APES MAPPER
 

National parks of the Central African Republic
Sangha-Mbaéré